Going Places was an Australian television series broadcast by the Nine Network in late 2007. It consisted of 8 half-hour-long episodes. Australian actor Sue McIntosh narrated the series, while her husband, John McIntosh, produced.

Overview
The series goes behind the scenes at Australian airline Jetstar as it moves into the highly competitive international market. The focus is on the people who make the airline tick, in particular cabin crew.

It is similar to the British show Airline and its American counterpart, which also follow low cost airlines.

See also
 List of programs broadcast by Nine Network
 List of Australian television series

External links
Official website

Nine Network original programming
Australian factual television series
2007 Australian television series debuts
2007 Australian television series endings
Aviation television series